Below is listed the equipment that the Argentine Air Force use.

Munitions

Aircraft guns

Firearms

Artillery

Anti-air artillery

Vehicles

Radars

See also 
Armed Forces of the Argentine Republic
List of active aircraft of the Argentine Air Force

References 

Argentine Air Force
Military equipment of Argentina